Elleipsisoma is a genus of parasites within the phylum Apicomplexia.

History 
This parasite was described in 1912 by Franca. This genus may have been described earlier by Graham-Smith

The type species is Elleipsisoma thomsoni

Hosts

This parasite infects the European mole (Talpa europaea). It is most commonly found in the heart and lungs. It may occasionally be found in the kidneys, liver and spleen.

Geographical distribution

This parasite is found in the United Kingdom.

Description

Parasitized red cells were larger than normal mature erythrocytes

Electron microscopic studies have shown the presence of rhoptries, micronemes, polar ring, microtubules and a conoid.

Vectors 
Possible vectors include the mites Eulaelaps stabularis, Haemogamasus hirsutus and Haemogamasus nidi.

References 

Apicomplexa genera
Conoidasida